Ghori  is a work of science fiction written in Bengali by the novelist Premendra Mitra. This story was first published in Chhayapoth, the Puja annual of Sarat Sahityo Bhaban, Kolkata, West Bengal, India, in 1948. It was the third story in GhanaDa series portraying Ghanashyam Das alias GhanaDa, the fictional character created by Premendra Mitra, and the protagonist of the GhanaDa series of science-fiction novels.

Characterization
The character of Ghanashyam Das alias Ghanada was outlined as a bachelor, dark complexioned male with tall, boney and skeletal structure, having age “anywhere between thirty five to fifty five”, as described by the author himself in Mosha, the first story of the Ghanada series. He stayed in the third floor attic of a shared apartment (মেস বাড়ি) at no. 72, Banamali Naskar Lane, Calcutta, West Bengal, India, along with other boarders, who called him Ghana-da, while the term “da” is a suffix added to the name of an elder male in Bengal to convey reverence and affection. Though he was rarely found engaged in any activity or work other than telling fantastic tales to the boarders of the apartment, his stories engaged him with most of the major events happened in the world for last two hundred years and there was no place on earth which he didn't visit. 

Premendra Mitra, the creator, described Ghana~da in an interview by A K Ganguly published in SPAN in 1974, as under:

Plot

It was a day of Derby, ie, there was a scheduled football (soccer) match between two big clubs of West Bengal, East Bengal and Mohan Bagan. The four close friends, Shibu, Gaur, Shishir and Sudhir, the author, who were boarders of the shared apartment at no. 72 Banamali Naskar Lane, were getting prepared to leave for the football stadium, keeping a keen watch on the time. Sudhir gave his clock to Gaur and said, “Keep it with yourself. You won't need asking the time repeatedly then.” Here entered GhanaDa, with a warning that clocks should not be accepted without a proper check. It could be disastrous. Getting inquisitive Shibu mentioned that GhanaDa was never seen having a clock. GhanaDa replied, “No, I do not have a clock, but once I received some.” “Received? How many, GhanaDa?” “As far as I remember”, GhanaDa replied indifferently, “Two lakh fifty three thousand three hundred and one only.” 

GhanaDa reminded of a massive Tsunami and cyclone occurred in the South Pacific Ocean on 17 September 1937. GhanaDa's story preceded the event by two months. At that time he was visiting an area covering from Hawaii to Fiji through Samoa, carrying out an import-export business, which was a cover hiding his actual identity. All of a sudden he received two telegrams from Neville and Frank on the same day, requesting him to undertake a secret service mission and to meet the sender at the earliest. They were understood to be Neville Chamberlain, Prime Minister of the United Kingdom, and Franklin Roosevelt, President of the United States. “Were they your friends, GhanaDa?”, asked Shibu. 

The author, Premendra Mitra, addressed the issue of international terrorism in this story. Some agencies in Asia distributed cheap clock attached with explosives with timer which were distributed throughout Europe and the United States, most of which were programmed to explode at a particular time and date destroying major infrastructure of these countries. With timely intervention of GhanaDa a major impending world disaster was averted. However, the crucial Eastbengal club versus Mohanbagan club football match was eventually missed by all.

Characters
Ghanashyam Das alias Ghanada
Gouranga alias Gour
Shibu
Shishir
Author (anonymous in this story. However, now we know it is Sudhir)
Mr. Okamoto, representative of the Clock manufacturing Company
Mr. Leyman, Police Chief of Samoa Island

References

External links

1948 short stories
Indian short stories
Science fiction short stories
Short stories set in India
Ghanada short stories